Stan is a settlement in the hills to the southeast of Mirna in the Municipality of Mirna in southeastern Slovenia. The municipality is included in the Southeast Slovenia Statistical Region. The area is part of the traditional region of Lower Carniola.

References

External links
Stan on Geopedia

Populated places in the Municipality of Mirna